Gilles Pelletier, OC (March 22, 1925 – September 5, 2018) was a Canadian actor.

Career 
Pelletier appeared in over 50 film and television productions between 1951 and 2016. He is perhaps best known for his portrayal of Corporal Jacques Gagnier in the police drama R.C.M.P. Among his film credits are Alfred Hitchcock's I Confess (1953), the Denys Arcand films Jesus of Montreal (1989) and The Barbarian Invasions (2003), and the short film Noël Blank (2003).

In 1964, he founded the Nouvelle Compagnie théâtrale, a live theatre for youths and served as director for fifteen years.

Personal life 
Pelletier is the brother of Denise Pelletier, a stage actress, whose name was given to the Prix Denise-Pelletier in 1998, for cultural and scientific achievements of French Canadians, which was awarded to Glles for his lifetime career in the theatre.

Pelletier was named Officer of the Order of Canada on July 11, 1988 for his services to drama, and was nominated for a Genie Award and a Gémeaux Award.

Filmography

References

External links
 

1925 births
2018 deaths
French Quebecers
Canadian male film actors
Canadian male stage actors
Canadian male television actors
Canadian theatre directors
Prix Denise-Pelletier winners
Officers of the Order of Canada
Male actors from Quebec
Place of birth missing
People from Laurentides